Daniel Joe Peters (born August 18, 1967) is the drummer for Mudhoney, having played with them since their formation in 1988. Prior to Mudhoney, he joined Bundle of Hiss when he was fifteen years old. 

He was also briefly the drummer for Nirvana in the summer of 1990, playing on one single, "Sliver", and making one live appearance with them that September in Seattle, shortly before drummer Dave Grohl joined. Peters has expressed his only regret as missing the chance to play drums on Nirvana's album Nevermind. Mudhoney's latest offering is Digital Garbage released on September 19, 2018. Peters also played drums for the Ellensburg, Washington based band Screaming Trees from 1990 to 1991, and appeared in the movie Black Sheep alongside David Spade and Chris Farley.

Discography

With Mudhoney
 Superfuzz Bigmuff (1988)
 Mudhoney (1989)
 Every Good Boy Deserves Fudge (1991)
 Piece of Cake (1992)
 Five Dollar Bob's Mock Cooter Stew (1993)
 My Brother the Cow (1995)
 Tomorrow Hit Today (1998)
 Since We've Become Translucent (2002)
 Under a Billion Suns (2006)
 The Lucky Ones (2008)
 Vanishing Point (2013)
Digital Garbage (2018)

With Nirvana
Sliver (1990) - single
Incesticide (1992) ("Sliver" only. Appears as drummer.)
Nirvana (2002) ("Sliver" only. Appears as drummer.)

With Love Battery
Confusion Au Go Go (1999)

References

1967 births
Living people
Grunge musicians
Nirvana (band) members
Mudhoney members
Screaming Trees members
American rock drummers
American people of Dutch descent
Musicians from Seattle
Love Battery members
20th-century American drummers
American male drummers
The Tripwires members